Romulea columnae, the sand crocus, is a herbaceous perennial in the family Iridaceae. It is a small plant, with thin narrow leaves, and small scape which has small pink, pale purple or violet pointed flowers with darker veining and a gold or yellow throat. It is native to a wide area ranging from western Europe to the Mediterranean.

Description

Romulea columnae grows from a small corm. 
Plants from the Romulea genus are related to members of the crocus genus and look very similar but have several differences, including that Romulea plants do not have the traditional crocus feature of having a white grove in the centre of their leaves.
Also that crocus flowers are stemless and grow directly from the corm, where as Romulea plants hold their flowers on a green scape of various lengths.

It blooms early in the year, from February onwards, or between March and May.
It has one to three flowers to a corm, most common is a solitary flower, which is small and only reaching between 10 and 12 mm across.
The flowers are funnel-shaped, and have 6 pointed (at the tip) petals, which are equally-sized. They are pink, pale purple, or violet. They are greenish-yellow, yellow, or golden-yellow at the centre or throat. They have purple, or violet veins or a dark midvein and a pair of lighter lateral veins. It has a green spathe which is thin and spindly.
It has three stamens, topped by yellow, or bright yellow anthers, and the style is shorter than the stamens.

It reproduces mostly by making seed.

Taxonomy

It is commonly known as sand crocus and occasionally as dune crocus, In Malta, it is known as the Lesser sand crocus due to another endemic Romulea species.

The Latin specific epithet columnae refers to column.

It was published and described by 2 Italian botanists, Francesco Antonio Sebastiani and Ernesto Mauri in 'Fl. Roman. Prodr.' vol.18 in 1818.

Romulea columnae was verified by United States Department of Agriculture Agricultural Research Service on 4 April 2003, and it is an accepted name by the RHS.

There are 4, or 2 known subspecies (grandiscapa and rollii);  
 Romulea columnae subsp. assumptionis (Font Quer) O.Bolòs, Vigo, Masalles & Ninot, in Fl. Man. Paísos Catalans: 1215 (1990)
 Romulea columnae subsp. columnae
 Romulea columnae subsp. grandiscapa (Webb) G.Kunkel, Monogr. Biol. Canar. 3: 25 (1972) from the Canary Islands, with a flower that is purple with a yellow throat.
 Romulea columnae subsp. rollii (Parl.) Marais, Kew Bull. 30: 707 (1975 publ. 1976).

Distribution and habitat

Romulea columnae is native to various temperate areas of western Asia, Africa and Europe.

Range
Within Africa, it is found in Macaronesia, (within the Madeira Islands, Canarias), Algeria, Morocco and Tunisia.
It is found in the Asian countries of Cyprus, Israel, Lebanon, Syria and western Turkey.
Within Europe, it is found in south west England, Greece (including Crete), Italy (including the isles of Sardinia and Sicily), France (including the island of Corsica), Spain (including the Balearic Islands) and Portugal.

It has naturalized with the Azores.

Habitat
It is found growing on free draining sandy soils that make up coastal cliffs slopes, and coastal grasslands. It can grow on sandy grounds near the sea. Including on golf courses, such as Dawlish Warren course in Devon, which is classified as a Site of Special Scientific Interest (SSSI).

Cultivation

In temperate gardens, it is best to grow the plant inside a temperature controlled Alpine house, it can be grown in containers filled with well-drained, loam-based compost. The plant is allowed to dry in summer after the flowers have faded and the leaves become yellow.

References

Other sources
 Botanical Society of the British Isles. BSBI taxon database (on-line resource).
 Davis, P. H., ed. 1965-1988. Flora of Turkey and the east Aegean islands.
 Hansen, A. & P. Sunding. 1993. Flora of Macaronesia: checklist of vascular plants, ed. 4. Sommerfeltia vol. 17.
 Izquierdo Z., I. et al., eds. 2004. Lista de especies silvestres de Canarias: hongos, plantas y animales terrestres
 Jahandiez, E. & R. Maire. 1931-1941. Catalogue des plantes du Maroc.
 Meikle, R. D. 1977-1985. Flora of Cyprus.
 Mouterde, P. 1966-. Nouvelle flore du Liban et de la Syrie.
 Silva, L. et al. 2005. Listagem da fauna e flora terrestres dos Açores. Lista des plantas vasculares (Pteridophyta e Spermatophyta).
 Tutin, T. G. et al., eds. 1964-1980. Flora europaea.
 Zohary, M. & N. Feinbrun-Dothan. 1966-. Flora palaestina.

External links
 large image of the flower

rosea
Flora of Europe
Flora of Madeira
Flora of the Canary Islands
Flora of North Africa
Flora of Western Asia
Plants described in 1818